Achilles Chih-t'ung Fang (August 20, 1910November 22, 1995) was a Chinese scholar, translator, and educator, best known for his contributions to Chinese literature and comparative literature. Fang was born in Japanese-occupied Korea, but attended university in mainland China.  After completing his undergraduate degree, Fang worked for Monumenta Serica, a prominent scholarly journal of Chinese topics.  He then moved to the United States, where he took up residency in Cambridge, Massachusetts, studying and teaching courses at Harvard University.

Fang was widely learned, and specialized in comparative literature, particularly in the studies of Chinese and German literature.  His correspondence with Ezra Pound significantly influenced Pound's understanding of Chinese subjects, and his doctoral dissertation on Pound, an attempt to compile all the classical allusions in The Cantos, remains an important source for Pound scholars.

Life and career

Youth 
Achilles Fang was born Fang Chih-t'ung (Fang Zhitong ) into a Chinese family living in Japanese-occupied Korea on August 20, 1910. He eventually left, with the help of a missionary, to attend high school at the American Baptist College in Shanghai. He subsequently majored in philosophy and classical studies at Tsinghua University, where he was one of the few friends of Qian Zhongshu (who would go on to write one of the best-known and most highly regarded works of modern Chinese literature, Fortress Besieged). After graduating in 1932, Fang spent two more years at Tsinghua as a graduate student, and then, within a period of four years spent in Nanjing and Beijing, was married, had a child, and suffered the death of his wife.

Monumenta Serica 
From 1940 to 1947, Fang worked for the East Asian studies journal Monumenta Serica in Beijing, first as editorial secretary and then as associate editor (the latter position he maintained for two years after leaving Beijing in 1947). The main content of Fang's work was to proofread translations in submissions to the journal, and he corrected errors with a scholar's meticulous zeal. Fang's own contributions included a regular "Review of Reviews" feature, wherein he summarized important articles in European and Japanese sinological journals, providing Western Sinologists with news of developments in Japanese Sinology that those without a knowledge of Japanese would otherwise not have had. Fang also taught German during this period, both at Fu-Jen University and the Deutschland-Institut.

Harvard 
In 1947, Fang moved to Cambridge with his son to work on the Harvard-Yenching Institute Chinese-English dictionary project. He was dismissed for constant use of quotations from Finnegans Wake in his entries, and subsequently enrolled in Harvard's comparative literature PhD program, from which he graduated in 1958 (in Burton Pike's graduating class) with a dissertation on Ezra Pound's The Cantos.  That dissertation, the 865-page "Materials for the Study of Pound's Cantos,"tracked down all the classical allusions in the Cantos, a work suited to his vast reading in many languages and acute detective instincts, as evidenced by one small example: In Canto 11 is the line, „der in Baluba das Gewitter gemacht hat,“ a quotation that Fang found in one of the seven volumes of Frobenius' Erlebte Erdteile, where the author is referring to the activities of an African shaman.

Fang became friendly with Pound while writing his dissertation, and decided not to publish it for fear of embarrassing Pound over Pound's many errors in his use of sources. During Pound's years at St. Elizabeths, Fang was Pound's key correspondent on Chinese topics.

Fang stayed on at Harvard teaching courses in classical Chinese, Chinese literary theory, and art criticism until he retired in 1977, having spent thirty years there in one capacity or another. He died of cancer in 1995, and was buried in Mount Auburn Cemetery. In 1997, through a gift of "the students and friends of Achilles Fang," Harvard established a prize in his honor, "awarded occasionally to a doctoral dissertation on the traditional Chinese humanities or related cultural developments throughout East Asia that continues the tradition, which Achilles Fang exemplified, of rigorous textual research."

Personality 
Fang was known to have a forceful personality. In a scene in Frederick Seidel's poem "Glory," a 1953 encounter is dramatized thus:

His [Ezra Pound's] pal Achilles Fang led me to the empty attic of the Yenching Institute,
In the vast gloom arranged two metal folding chairs
Under the one lightbulb hanging from the ceiling,
And hating me, knee to knee,
Unsmilingly asked, What do you know?

Indeed, Fang was not the type to hold back criticism nor to offer undeserved praise. Yet he loved teaching, and he was an extremely devoted teacher who won the affection and devotion of students, whom he sometimes invited to his home to drink beer. As far back as his days at Monumenta Serica, he would work with American exchange students who came to him for advice and help, always refusing payment, and his generosity with his time continued until the end of his life: he met with students throughout his retirement and illness, and even spent an hour with one the day before he died.

Fang was an avid, even obsessive book collector. His obituarist writes:

Books were his lifelong passion. He found sympathetic souls in two Ch'ing dynasty bibliophiles and translated their charming essays on the subject of book collecting under the titles "Bookman's Decalogue" and "Bookman's Manual." After coming to the United States he began to acquire a library of Western books and soon was as well known to Boston antiquarian dealers as he had been in Peking's Liu-li ch'ang. His interests were catholic: Latin and Greek literature (two complete sets of the Loeb Classics, acquired one title at a time over the years, all used or damaged remainders), a complete Patrology in Latin, works on philosophy and literature ancient and modern. He pursued congenial writers relentlessly: everything by George Saintsbury, all of Virginia Woolf in first editions, everything in print by or about Pound and Joyce. he set up rows of stacks in his office, as in most rooms of his house, which was threatened with collapse when he gave up his office on retirement and brought the books home, a shopping bagful at a time over the course of a year. Before his death he willed the collection to Peking University Library, after sending an initial shipment of some 5,000 volumes for which he could find no space.

Publications 
It was said of Fang that "he knew everything, but published little." Indeed, his complete bibliography runs only four pages. Aside from his dissertation, his most significant publication may have been his heavily annotated translation of ten chapters from Sima Guang's Zizhi Tongjian, published as The Chronicle of the Three Kingdoms in Harvard-Yenching Institute Studies VI (1952). His translation and annotation of the Wen fu of Lu Ji is also widely cited.

References

Citations

Sources 

 Fang, Ilse M. "Bibliography of Achilles Fang." Monumenta Serica 45 (1997): 399–403.
 
 Kelly, Jeanne and Nathan K. Mao. "Afterword." Fortress Besieged. By Qian Zhongshu. New York: New Directions, 2004. [Original publication of Fortress Besieged in Chinese was in 1947.]
 Seidel, Frederick. "Glory." My Tokyo. New York: Farrar, Straus and Giroux, 1993.
 Weinberger, Eliot. Note on Achilles Fang in "Contributors' Notes." Weinberger, Eliot, ed. The New Directions Anthology of Classical Chinese Poetry. New York, NY: New Directions, 2004.

External links 

 Achilles Fang Papers. Yale Collection of American Literature, Beinecke Rare Book and Manuscript Library.

Chinese sinologists
Tsinghua University alumni
Harvard University alumni
Harvard University faculty
1910 births
1995 deaths
Burials at Mount Auburn Cemetery
Chinese expatriates in Korea
Chinese expatriates in the United States